The Wild Horse Stampede is a 1926 American silent Western film directed by Clifford Smith and starring Jack Hoxie, Fay Wray and Marin Sais.

Cast
 Jack Hoxie as Jack Tanner 
 Fay Wray as Jessie Hayden 
 William Steele as Charlie Champion 
 Marin Sais as Grace Connor 
 Clark Comstock as Cross Hayden 
 Jack Pratt as Henchman 
 Art Mix as Henchman 
 Bert De Marc as Henchman 
 Monte Montague as Henchman

References

Bibliography
 Munden, Kenneth White. The American Film Institute Catalog of Motion Pictures Produced in the United States, Part 1. University of California Press, 1997.

External links
 

1926 films
1926 Western (genre) films
1920s English-language films
Universal Pictures films
Films directed by Clifford Smith
American black-and-white films
Silent American Western (genre) films
1920s American films